The men's 800 metres at the 2017 World Para Athletics Championships was held at the Olympic Stadium in London from 14 to 23 July. The results of the men's 800 m T54 race on Monday 17 July were nullified and the race rescheduled to Friday 21 July after three competitors crashed at the 600-metre mark. Marcel Hug won the original race. The race took place on Friday evening without Richard Chiassaro who had been disqualified.

Medalists

Events listed in pink were contested but no medals were awarded.

See also
List of IPC world records in athletics

References

800 metres
2017 in men's athletics
800 metres at the World Para Athletics Championships